The Paratrooper of Mechanic Avenue is the first novel by the American writer Lester Goran. It is set in Pittsburgh, Pennsylvania, and spans a time period from the Great Depression to the postwar era.

It tells the story of Ike-o Hartwell, born into the fictional Pittsburgh slum of Sobaski's Stairway, and how he learns to survive amid the neon glow of pawn shops and poolrooms on Mechanic Avenue peopled by racketeers, pimps, gangs, and ward heelers. Then the army drafts him for the Korean War. After a dishonorable discharge, he dresses as a paratrooper and expects a hero's s welcome back on Mechanic Avenue.

References

External links
Matthew Asprey Gear's 2010 essay "From Sobaski’s Stairway to the Irish Club: Lester Goran’s Pittsburgh"

1960 American novels
Novels by Lester Goran
Novels set in Pittsburgh
Houghton Mifflin books
1960 debut novels